Lucy Ward may refer to:

 Lucy Ward (footballer) (born 1974), English footballer
 Lucy Ward (musician), British folk singer, guitarist and concertina player

See also
 Lucy Ward Stebbins (1880–1955), Dean of Women at University of California, Berkeley